There's a Garden of Crosses in No Man's Land is a World War I song written by William Robinson and composed by Gus Wackrow. The song was published in 1918 by the Elite Publishing Company in Boston, MA.

The sheet music cover depicts Lady Liberty holding a laurel wreath over a cemetery with barbed wire.

References

Bibliography
Parker, Bernard S. World War I Sheet Music 2. Jefferson: McFarland & Company, Inc., 2007. . 
Vogel, Frederick G. World War I Songs: A History and Dictionary of Popular American Patriotic Tunes, with Over 300 Complete Lyrics. Jefferson: McFarland & Company, Inc., 1995. . 

1918 songs
Songs of World War I